The People's Party of Ceuta (PP) is the regional section of the People's Party of Spain (PP) in Ceuta. It was formed in 1989 from the re-foundation of the People's Alliance.

References

People's Party (Spain)
Political parties in Ceuta
Political parties established in 1989
1989 establishments in Spain